The northern tinker frog, northern timber frog, or tinkling frog  (Taudactylus rheophilus) is a species of frog in the family Myobatrachidae. It is endemic to humid mountainous areas of north-eastern Queensland in Australia. It lives among rocks and logs at small fast-flowing streams. Adults are nocturnal.

Conservation status
As most other members of the genus Taudactylus, this species has declined drastically. It is listed as Critically Endangered on the IUCN Red List and under the Environment Protection and Biodiversity Conservation Act 1999. The precise reason for this decline is unclear, but likely linked to the disease chytridiomycosis. It may also be threatened by habitat loss.

References

Taudactylus
Frogs of Australia
Endemic fauna of Australia
Amphibians of Queensland
EPBC Act critically endangered biota
Amphibians described in 1973
Taxa named by William Hosmer (herpetologist)
Taxonomy articles created by Polbot